Major General George Tupper Campbell Carter-Campbell,  (2 April 1869 – 19 December 1921) was a senior British Army officer who served in the Second Boer War and the First World War.

Early life
A member of the Carter-Campbell of Possil family, Carter-Campbell was born in Kensington, the third son of Thomas Tupper Carter-Campbell of Possil and his wife, Emily Georgina Campbell, daughter of George Campbell of Inverneill.

Military career
Carter-Campbell entered the Royal Military College, Sandhurst, and was commissioned on 23 October 1889 as a second lieutenant into the Cameronians (Scottish Rifles). In the next decade he was promoted to lieutenant on 29 April 1892, and to captain on 2 November 1897. He served in the Second Boer War (1899–1902) as adjutant of the 2nd Battalion, which took part in the Ladysmith Relief Force, where he was present at the battles of Colenso (December 1899), Spion Kop (January 1900), Vaal Krantz and the Tugela Heights (February 1900). They served in Natal from March to June 1900, then in Transvaal east of Pretoria from July to November 1900. For his services he was promoted brevet major on 29 November 1900, and twice mentioned in despatches. Following the end of hostilities in South Africa, he returned to the United Kingdom in August 1902.

On the outbreak of World War I, Carter-Campbell proceeded to France with the 8th Division as second-in-command of the 2nd Battalion, Cameronians (Scottish Rifles) and was wounded during the Battle of Neuve Chapelle on 10 March 1915, being awarded the Distinguished Service Order and also the Order of St. Stanislaus. He subsequently commanded the battalion until 23 September 1915, when he was promoted brigadier general to command the 94th Infantry Brigade. While holding the latter command, he was gazetted brevet lieutenant colonel and finally Brevet-Colonel.

He assumed command of the 51st (Highland) Division on 17 March 1918, taking over from Major General George Harper, and was its GOC until he was transferred to the Rhine to take command of a brigade there, shortly before the division preceded home for demobilization. While in command of the 51st Division, Carter-Campbell was awarded the C.B. and the French Legion of Honour (Croix du Commandeur).

Carter-Campbell was wounded during the First World War. After the war had ended, and he had recovered sufficiently, he was made GOC Northern Ireland in 1920.

However, he died in 1921 at Queen Alexandra Military Hospital in London, with his war service being blamed for his premature death.

Family
He married Frances Elizabeth Ward. They had two children, Dorothy Catherine Carter-Campbell b. 29 Oct 1909 and Duncan Maclachlan Carter-Campbell, 8th of Possil (5 Dec 1911 –  Jan 1990).

See also
 List of Légion d'honneur recipients by name
 Covenanter
 Cameronian

Notes

External links
 A selection of books referring to General Carter-Campbell

1869 births
British Army major generals
British Army General List officers
1921 deaths
British Army personnel of the Second Boer War
British Army generals of World War I
Scottish generals
Graduates of the Royal Military College, Sandhurst
Companions of the Order of the Bath
Cameronians officers
People from Kensington
Commandeurs of the Légion d'honneur
Recipients of the Order of Saint Stanislaus (Russian)
Companions of the Distinguished Service Order
George
Chevaliers of the Légion d'honneur
Military personnel from London